Kim Hyon-gyong ( or  ) is a wrestler from North Korea. She won a bronze medal at the 2014 World Wrestling Championships.

References

External links
 

Year of birth missing (living people)
Living people
North Korean female sport wrestlers
Place of birth missing (living people)
World Wrestling Championships medalists
Wrestlers at the 2016 Summer Olympics
Olympic wrestlers of North Korea
21st-century North Korean women